John Clapp is a visual artist from the San Francisco Bay Area. He was educated at Art Center College of Design in Pasadena, California, and is a professor in the School of Art & Design at San Jose State University in San Jose, California.

Bibliography
As of 2006, Clapp has illustrated five books for children.

The Stone Fey by Robin McKinley, Harcourt Brace & Company, 1998. 
Right Here on This Spot by Sharon Hart Addy, Houghton Mifflin Company, 1999. 
The Prince of Butterflies by Bruce Coville, Harcourt Brace & Company, 2002. .
On Christmas Eve by Liz Rosenberg, Roaring Brook Press, 2002. .
Shining by Julius Lester, Silver Whistle, 2003. .

References

External links
 John Clapp

American illustrators
Living people
Year of birth missing (living people)
San Jose State University faculty
Artists from the San Francisco Bay Area